KF Butrinti is an Albanian football club based in the southern city of Sarandë. The club's home ground is the Andon Lapa Stadium and they currently compete in the Kategoria e Dytë. The club falls under the KS Butrinti sports club which also features one of the most successful swimming teams in the country, with football being the second priority by the club. Their best season was in 2015-16 when they finished third in the Kategoria e Parë

History
The first sports club in the city of Sarandë was formed by Kristoforidh Harito, Ruhi Selfo and Nazar Sefo on 25 November 1939 as the Shoqeria Sportive Butrinti, which translates to the Butrint Sports Society. The name is taken from the Ancient Greek city of Buthrotum, which in Albanian is called Butrint. The current club was merely a continuation of the original Butrint Sports Society and it was formed on 2 March 1963 as Klubi Sportive Butrinti, which in English would be Butrint Sports Club. However, other sources including prominent football historian Giovanni Armillotta believe the club was formed in the mid-1940s as Butrinti Sarandë and they changed their name shortly after in 1949 to simply Sarandë for two years before being renamed Puna Sarandë by the ruling Party of Labour of Albania between 1951 and 1958. In 1958, the club reverted to its original name of Butrinti Sarandë.

Honours
Albanian Second Division
Winners (1): 2010–11

Albanian Third Division
Winners (4): 1961, 1963–64, 1979–80

Sporti Popullor Cup
Winners (1): 1980

Current squad

References

Butrinti
Sarandë
 
Albanian Third Division clubs
Kategoria e Dytë clubs